James Matthew Hatchett (born April 12, 1966) is an American businessman and politician from Georgia. Hatchett is a Republican member of the Georgia House of Representatives from the 150th District.

Early life 
Hatchett was born in Dublin, Georgia. Hatchett graduated from Dublin High School.

Education 
In 1988, Hatchett earned a Bachelor of Science degree in Applied Mathematics from Presbyterian College.

Career 
Hatchett is a businessman.

In 1999, Hatchett became a city councilman of Dublin, Georgia until 2009.

On November 2, 2010, Hatchett won the election and became a Republican member of Georgia House of Representatives for District 143. Hatchett defeated Pablo Santamaria with 54.71% of the vote.

On November 6, 2012, Hatchett won the election and became a Republican member of Georgia House of Representatives for District 150. On November 4, 2014, as an incumbent, Hatchett won the election unopposed and continued serving District 150.  On November 8, 2016, as an incumbent, Hatchett won the election unopposed and continued serving District 150. On November 6, 2018, as an incumbent, Hatchett won the election unopposed and continued serving District 150. On November 3, 2020, as an incumbent, Hatchett won the election unopposed and continued serving District 150.

Hatchett is a Majority Cactus Chairman of Georgia Republican Party.

Personal life 
Hatchett's wife is Kim Hatchett. They have two children. Hatchett and his family live in Dublin, Georgia.

References

External links 
 Matt Hatchett at ballotpedia.org
 Matt Hatchett at gahousegop.org
 votehatchett.com
 Matt Hatchett at dlcda.com
 Matt Hatchett at hometownhealthonline.com

Living people
Republican Party members of the Georgia House of Representatives
1966 births
People from Laurens County, Georgia
21st-century American politicians